Michael Mosley (born September 16, 1978) is an American television and film actor, best known for his roles as Drew Suffin on Scrubs (2009–2010), Ted Vanderway on Pan Am (2011-2012), Jerry Tyson aka 3XK on Castle (2010, 2012, & 2015), Johnny Farrell on Sirens (2014–2015), Pastor Mason Young on the award winning Netflix crime drama Ozark (2017-2018), and Everett Lynch on Criminal Minds (2019-2020).

Personal life
Mosley was born in Cedar Falls, Iowa. He was engaged to actress Anna Camp by September 2008; they married in 2010 and filed for divorce in 2013.

Filmography

Film

Television

References

External links
 

1978 births
21st-century American male actors
American male film actors
American male television actors
Living people
Male actors from Iowa
People from Cedar Falls, Iowa